Just for Fun is a 1963 British musical film directed by Gordon Flemyng. It was written by Amicus co-founder Milton Sobotsky.

Plot
When English teenagers win the right to vote, the established political parties compete for their support. However, when the Prime Minister cuts the amount of Pop music allowed on TV, young Mark and Cherry start their own 'Teenage Party' and use some of England's pop singers to help.

Cast

Mark Wynter as Mark
Cherry Roland as Cherry
Richard Vernon as Prime minister
Reginald Beckwith as Opposition leader
John Wood as Official
Jeremy Lloyd as Prime minister's son
Harry Fowler as Interviewer
Edwin Richfield as Man with a CND badge
Alan Freeman as Narrator
David Jacobs as Disc Jockey
Jimmy Savile as Disc Jockey
Irene Handl as Housewife
Hugh Lloyd as Plumber
Dick Emery
Mario Fabrizi
Ken Parry
Gary Hope
Douglas Ives
Ian Gray
John Martin
Jack Bentley
Frank Williams
Gordon Rollings
Bobby Vee
The Crickets
Freddy Cannon
Johnny Tillotson
Ketty Lester
Joe Brown and the Bruvvers
Karl Denver
Kenny Lynch
Jet Harris
Tony Meehan
Clodagh Rodgers
Louise Cordet
Lyn Cornell
The Tornados
The Springfields
The Spotnicks
Jimmy Powell
Brian Poole and the Tremeloes
Sounds Incorporated
The Vernons Girls

Critical reception
TCM wrote, "episodic in the extreme, Just for Fun plays like an evening of Vaudeville, with the various singing acts punctuated by broad comic bits that are more miss than hit but retain, at least at this distance, an undeniable vintage charm...sweet relief comes in the form of the assembled musical talent, whose contributions are well-staged by director Gordon Flemyng."

References

External links
 Just for Fun at TCMDB
 
 
 

1963 films
1963 musical films
British black-and-white films
Films set in London
Columbia Pictures films
Amicus Productions films
British musical films
Films directed by Gordon Flemyng
Films shot at Twickenham Film Studios
1960s English-language films
1960s British films